Byurakan 	() is a village in the Ashtarak Municipality of the Aragatsotn Province of Armenia, located on the slope of Mount Aragats. The village is home to several historical sites including the 7th-century Artavazik Church, the 10th-century basilica of Saint Hovhannes and a huge 13th-century khachkar monument. 

It is also home to the Byurakan Observatory.

Byurakan Observatory 
Byurakan observatory is founded in 1946 by Viktor Hambardzumyan, Armenian scientist. There are several telescopes. The diameter of the biggest telescope is 2.6m (the biggest telescope in Caucasus). There is also a 1m Schmidt telescope.

Gallery

References 

World Gazetteer: Armenia – World-Gazetteer.com
Report of the results of the 2001 Armenian Census
Kiesling, Rediscovering Armenia, p. 15, available online at the US embassy to Armenia's website

Populated places in Aragatsotn Province